The Bloc Borys Olijnyk and Myhailo Syrota was an electoral alliance in Ukraine created in December 2005.

At the 2006 parliamentary elections the alliance won 0.8% of the popular vote and no seats.
 
The alliance had the following members:
Political Party "Informational Ukraine"
Political Party "Party of Health"
Labor Party of Ukraine

References

Defunct political party alliances in Ukraine